Gentiana alpina (commonly Alpine gentian) is a plant species from the Gentiana genus in the family Gentianaceae.

Description

Vegetative features

The Alpine gentian is a perennial herb that grows to only . The opposite leaves are crowded at the base of the stem . The leaf margins are cartilaginous.

Generative traits

The flowers are individually terminal on the stems. The hermaphrodite flowers are radially symmetric with a double perianth. The five green sepals are fused up to about half their length into a calyx tube, which ends in five ovoid calyx teeth that narrow towards the base. There are green dots in the crown gullet, the crown lobes are blunt and mostly rounded. G. alpina takes a hemicryptophytic form.

Occurrence
Gentiana alpina is found in the south-west and west of the Middle Alps, the Middle Pyrenees and in the Sierra Nevada of southern Spain. In the Alps, G. alpina typically occur in the Caricion curvulae plant association.

In popular culture
Adolf von Kleebsattel created the song „Blau blüht der Enzian“, which became a bestseller thanks to performances by the musician Heino. The song provided the title of a feature film: Blue Blooms the Gentian.

Further reading

References

alpina
Flora of the Alps
Flora of the Pyrenees